The Department of National Defence (DND) is the department of the Government of Canada which supports the Canadian Armed Forces in its role of defending Canadian national interests domestically and internationally. The department is a civilian organization, part of the public service, and supports the armed forces; however, as a civilian organization is separate and not part of the military itself. National Defence is the largest department of the Government of Canada in terms of budget, and it is the department with the largest number of buildings (6,806 in 2015).

The department is responsible to Parliament through the minister of national defence Anita Anand . The deputy minister of National Defence, the senior most civil servant within the department, is responsible for the day-to-day leadership and operations of the department and reports directly to the minister. The department exists to aid the minister in carrying out their responsibilities within the Defence Portfolio and provides a civilian support system for the Canadian Armed Forces. Under the National Defence Act, the Canadian Armed Forces is a completely separate and distinct organization from, and is not part of, the Department of National Defence.

History

The Department of National Defence was established by the National Defence Act, which merged the Department of Militia and Defence (which was created in 1906 when the British Army withdrew its forces stationed in Canada), the Department of Naval Services (the department responsible for the administration of the Royal Canadian Navy), and the Air Board (which oversaw aviation in Canada). The National Defence Act was passed by the Parliament of Canada on June 28, 1922.

Organization

Both the Canadian Armed Forces (military) and the Department of National Defence (civilian public servants) are, although two separate organizations, known collectively as the 'Defence Team' as both institutions work closely together in the defence of Canada. The minister of national defence, as the Cabinet minister responsible to Parliament for National Defence, heads the Defence Team.

Deputy Minister 
The Department of National Defence is led by the Deputy Minister of National Defence, currently, Bill Matthews.  The Deputy Minister is chosen by the cabinet through the recommendation of the Prime Minister at that time. The Deputy Minister will stay in their position regardless of whether the cabinet or Prime Minister has changed.

Deputy Minister's Office 
The Deputy Minister has a varying amount of Assistant Deputy Minister's (referred to as ADM's), Chief's, and Associates that over see various tasks within the department ranging from Material Acquisition to Information Management to Public Affairs. There are 3 other office's that operate under the Deputy Minister which are DND/CF Legal Advisors, National Security and Intelligence Review and oversight Coordination Secretariat, and the Chief of Defence intelligence.

Associate Deputy Minister 

The associate Deputy Minister has no set role description. They are to take over the files and tasks the Deputy Minister gives them. The position is currently vacant.

Assistant Deputy Minister (Public Affairs) 
The Assistant Deputy Minister (Public affairs), referred to as ADM(PA), oversee communications related tasks such as advice and guidance in relation to Canada's defences. The position is currently held by Taylor Paxton, who reports directly to the Deputy Minister.

Assistant Deputy Minister (Defence Research and Development Canada) 
The Assistant Deputy Minister (Defence Research and Development Canada), referred to as ADM(DRDC), oversees the department's scientific and technological advancements and provides sound technological advice on Canada's defence systems. No name is currently assigned to this position. The ADM(DRDC) reports directly to the Deputy Minister.

Assistant Deputy Minister (Information Management) 
The Assistant Deputy Minister (Information Management) recently changed their name to Chief Information Officer, referred to as CIO. The CIO group oversees the management of key information and intelligence for Canada's defence and cyber operations for DND and CAF. The position is currently held by Leonard (Len) Bastien, who is also the department's Defence Champion for Persons with Disabilities. The CIO reports directly to the Deputy Minister.

Assistant Deputy Minister (Review Services) 
The  Assistant Deputy Minister (Review Services), referred to as ADM(RS), oversees changes and reviews requested policies and promote improvements to Canadian operations at home and abroad. The position is currently held by Julie Charron, who reports directly to the Deputy Minister.

Assistant Deputy Minister (Data, Innovation, and Analytics) 
The Assistant Deputy Minister (Data, Innovation, and Analytics), referred to as ADM(DIA), oversees data decision taken by the department as well as overseeing its integration into the department and analytics. The position is currently held by Stephen Burt, who reports directly to the Deputy Minister.

Assistant Deputy Minister (Policy) 
The Assistant Deputy Minister (Policy), referred to as ADM(POL), oversees defence policy proceedings, developments, and support for the department and the Canadian Armed Forces. The position has been held by Peter Hammerschmidt since 2017 and he reports directly to the Minister of National Defence.

Assistant Deputy Minister (Finance) 
The Assistant Deputy Minister (Finance), referred to as ADM(FIN) or Chief Financial Officer, oversees all financial dealings within the department including but not limited to financial management, budget approvals, financial reallocation, and financial support. The position has been held by Cheri Crosby since 2019 and she reports directly to the Minister of National Defence.

Assistant Deputy Minister (Material) 
The Assistant Deputy Minister (Material), referred to as ADM(MAT), oversees all Material acquisitions and service that are needed by the department or Canadian Armed Forces. The position has been held by Troy Crosby since 2019 and he reports directly to the Minister of National Defence.

Assistant Deputy Minister (Infrastructure & Environment) 
The Assistant Deputy Minister (Infrastructure & Environment), referred to as ADM(IE), oversees real estates acquisitions and needs for the Canadian Armed Forces as well as property management, infrastructure and environmental needs related to the department. The position has been held by Rob Chambers since 2019 and reports directly to the Minister of National Defence.

Assistant Deputy Minister (Human Resources - Civilian) 
The Assistant Deputy Minister (Human Resources - Civilian), referred to as ADM(HR-Civ), oversees all the human resources needs of the Defence Teams civilian members which includes but is not limited to recruitment, retention strategies, employment offers, and staffing policies. The position has been held by Isabelle Desmartis since 2016 and reports directly to the Minister of National Defence.

The Canadian Armed Forces is a separate and distinct military organization which works closely with, but is not a part of, the civilian department. The military comprises a variety of commands including the Royal Canadian Navy, Canadian Army and Royal Canadian Air Force, and is led by the chief of the defence staff, who is under the direction of the minister of national defence. There are also a variety of offices and support organizations which report to both the chief of defence staff and the deputy minister.

The legal military chain of command within the Canadian Forces originates from the king, represented by the governor general, who is commander-in-chief. The appointment of the minister, deputy minister, chief of the defence staff and the granting of all commissions in the Canadian Forces are made on behalf of the king.

Defence Portfolio

One of the roles of the Department of National Defence is to support the minister of national defence in the administration of the 'Defence Portfolio', which comprises the Canadian Armed Forces, the Communications Security Establishment, Defence Research and Development Canada, and the Department of National Defence. These organizations are responsible to the minister. The department is not responsible for all of these organizations itself but rather exists to support the minister in carrying out the minister's duties within the Defence Portfolio.

The post of associate minister of national defence, who is also a member of the Cabinet, also exists and takes on files as assigned by the minister of national defence. Since forming government in 2015, Prime Minister Justin Trudeau has assigned the post of associate minister as an additional role of the minister of veterans affairs, who heads Veterans Affairs Canada, another department outside the Defence Portfolio.

See also

Armed Forces Council
Military history of Canada
Union of National Defence Employees

References

External links

Archival papers held at University of Toronto Archives and Records Management Services

 
Federal departments and agencies of Canada
Military of Canada
Canada
Ministries established in 1923
1923 establishments in Canada
Canada